Adrián Popa (born 8 December 1971, in Sibiu) is a Hungarian weightlifter of Romanian descent.

He has represented his country in the Men's 64 kg event of the 1996 Summer Olympics, ranking 5th, the Men's 69 kg event of the 1998 World Weightlifting Championships, the Men's 77 kg event of the 1999 World Weightlifting Championships and the Men's 77 kg event of the 2000 Summer Olympics.

Major results

References

External links
Adrián Popa at sports-reference.com

Olympic weightlifters of Hungary
1971 births
Living people
Hungarian people of Romanian descent
Hungarian male weightlifters
Weightlifters at the 1996 Summer Olympics